ASLIB: The Association for Information Management (often stylized Aslib) was a British association of special libraries and information centres. It was founded in England in 1924 as the Association of Special Libraries and Information Bureaux. The organization ceased functioning as an independent organization in 2010, when it became a division of Emerald Group Publishing. Since 2015, ASLIB has existed only as Emerald's professional development arm.

Wartime documentation

ASLIB played a particular role in World War II obtaining journals and other documents from the Axis powers countries. Many countries around the world lost access to the documentation of academic and scientific information during wartime. UK libraries were often able to obtain these documents through neutral European countries. With Eugene Power, microfilming expert, and with funding from some US foundations such as the Rockefeller Foundation, ASLIB set up a large microfilming service that was able to supply key publications to countries that had no other access to them.

Publications
ASLIB published these journals:
 ASLIB Proceedings: New Information Perspectives
 Journal of Documentation
 Library Hi Tech News : incorporating Online and CD Notes
 Performance Measurement and Metrics
 Program: electronic library & information systems
 Records Management Journal
 Reference Reviews : incorporating ASLIB Book Guide
 ASLIB Directory of Information Sources in the United Kingdom (First published in 1928).

From 1973, the Audiovisual Group of ASLIB, in conjunction with the Audiovisual Group of the Library Association, published:
 The Audiovisual Librarian

See also
 Cranfield Experiments

References

Further reading

External links
 

Library associations in the United Kingdom
Defunct organisations based in the United Kingdom
Organizations disestablished in 2010